Moha may refer to:

Places
Moha, Belgium, a village in the municipality of Wanze, province of Liège, Belgium
County of Moha, medieval fief based on the village in Belgium
Moha, British Columbia, a rural locality located in British Columbia, Canada
Moha, Hungary, a village in Hungary

People
Bob Moha (1890–1959), American middleweight boxer
Moha El Yaagoubi  (born 1977), Moroccan footballer
Moha Rharsalla (born 1993), Moroccan–Spanish football player
Moha (footballer, born 1997), Moroccan footballer
Moha (footballer, born 1999), Moroccan footballer

Other uses
Moha (Buddhism), a state in which the mind is not clear, one of the three poisons of Buddhism
Moha (tree), Madhuca longifolia
Wat Moha Montrey, a monastery temple in Phnom Penh, Cambodia
Moha culture, an internet meme spoofing Jiang Zemin, former General Secretary of the Communist Party of China and paramount leader of China